During the 2008 United States presidential election, newspapers, magazines, and other publications made general election endorsements. As of November 4, 2008, Barack Obama had received more than twice as many publication endorsements as John McCain; in terms of circulation, the ratio was more than 3 to 1, according to the detailed tables below. In summary:

According to Editor & Publisher magazine, as of November 3, 2008, there were 273 newspapers endorsing Barack Obama compared to 172 for John McCain. By comparison, the magazine reported that before election day in 2004, John Kerry received 213 endorsements compared to 205 for George W. Bush.

UWIRE, in its Presidential Scorecard, reported that Barack Obama led John McCain by 94 to 2 in college newspaper endorsements, as of November 4.

The Association of Alternative Newsweeklies reported that Barack Obama led John McCain by 57 to 0 in endorsements among its 123 member newspapers as of October 31, 2008.

For a full list of newspapers that have endorsed John McCain, see Newspaper endorsements in the United States presidential election, 2008, for John McCain.

For a list of newspapers that have chosen not to endorse a candidate, see Newspaper endorsements in the United States presidential election, 2008.

Daily newspapers for Obama

Weekly newspapers for Obama

College and University newspapers for Obama

Magazines and other publications

See also
 Newspaper endorsements in the United States presidential primaries

References 

2008 United States presidential election
2004
2008 in mass media
Barack Obama 2008 presidential campaign
2008 United States presidential election endorsements